The House Among the Cactuses is a 2022 Spanish psychological thriller film directed by Carlota González-Adrio in her feature debut and written by Paul Pen. It is an adaptation of the latter's novel of the same name. It stars Ariadna Gil, Daniel Grao, and Ricardo Gómez.

Plot 
The plot concerns the arrival of (and ensuing disruption caused by) a stranger (Rafa) to an idyllic community of cacti-growing people living in a remote valley and hiding a secret. The aforementioned community is formed by Rosa, Emilio and their daughters, all of them named after flowers (Lis, Iris, Melisa, Lila and Dalia).

Cast

Production 
The film is a Cine365 Films, DZ Largometrajes y Audiovisuales AIE, Ikiru Films, La Terraza Films and Virtual Contenidos production, with the participation or association of RTVE, TV3, Orange TV and ICAA. It was shot on locations of Gran Canaria, including Arucas, Firgas, Valleseco, and Las Palmas. Filmax nabbed the film's distribution rights in post-production.

Release 
The film was slated to have a pre-screening at Madrid's Cines Renoir Princesa on 12 September 2022. It was
theatrically released in Spain on 16 September 2022. It was also selected for screening in the 'Made in Spain' slate of the 70th San Sebastián International Film Festival.

Reception 
Toni Vall of Cinemanía rated the film 3½ out of 5 stars, conceptualizing it as a symbiosis of Captain Fantastic and The Beguiled.

Blai Morell of Fotogramas rated it 3 out of 5 stars, highlighting the children cast and the "unhealthy atmosphere that transpires".

Accolades 

|-
| align = "center" | 2023 || 15th Gaudí Awards || Best New Director || Carlota González-Adrio ||  || 
|}

See also 
 List of Spanish films of 2022

References

See also 
 The House Among the Cactuses at ICAA's Catálogo de Cinespañol

Films based on Spanish novels
2022 directorial debut films
Films shot in the Canary Islands
2022 psychological thriller films
Spanish thriller films
Ikiru Films films
2020s Spanish films
2020s Spanish-language films
Spanish psychological thriller films